Baranovich may refer to:
Yeshiva Ohel Torah-Baranovich in Baranavichy
Yefim Baranovich (1884-1948), Russian and Soviet military officer
Lazar Baranovich (1620-1693), Ukrainian Orthodox archbishop

See also

Michele Baranowicz